Chloromyia is a genus of flies in the family Stratiomyidae.

Species
Chloromyia bella (Loew, 1857)
Chloromyia caeligera Lindner, 1939
Chloromyia cingulata Lindner, 1972
Chloromyia coerulea Yang, Zhang & Li, 2014
Chloromyia formosa (Scopoli, 1763)
Chloromyia speciosa (Macquart, 1834)
Chloromyia tuberculata James, 1952

References

Stratiomyidae
Brachycera genera
Diptera of Africa
Diptera of Asia
Diptera of Europe